Sandrine Bony-Léna, née Bony, is a French-born climatologist who is currently Director of research at the Centre National de la Recherche Scientifique (CNRS) at Sorbonne University, Paris. Bony was notably a lead author of the Nobel Prize-winning (2007) Fourth Assessment Report of the Intergovernmental Panel on Climate Change.

Distinctions
 2012: the Bernard Haurwitz Memorial Lecture prize awarded by the American Meteorological Society (AMS).
 2017: the Gérard-Mégie prize of the Académie des Sciences.
 2017: Chevalier de la Légion d'honneur.
2018: CNRS Silver Medal.

Selected works

References

Sources
 https://www.ipcc.ch/
La prévision du climat est-elle fiable ? (lemonde.fr)  02 juin 2013

Year of birth missing (living people)
French climatologists
Living people